In computer science, rate-monotonic scheduling (RMS) is a priority assignment algorithm used in real-time operating systems (RTOS) with a static-priority scheduling class. The static priorities are assigned according to the cycle duration of the job, so a shorter cycle duration results in a higher job priority.

These operating systems are generally preemptive and have deterministic guarantees with regard to response times. Rate monotonic analysis is used in conjunction with those systems to provide scheduling guarantees for a particular application.

Introduction
A simple version of rate-monotonic analysis assumes that threads have the following properties:

No resource sharing (processes do not share resources, e.g. a hardware resource, a queue, or any kind of semaphore blocking or non-blocking (busy-waits))
Deterministic deadlines are exactly equal to periods
Static priorities (the task with the highest static priority that is runnable immediately preempts all other tasks)
Static priorities assigned according to the rate monotonic conventions (tasks with shorter periods/deadlines are given higher priorities)
Context switch times and other thread operations are free and have no impact on the model

It is a mathematical model that contains a calculated simulation of periods in a closed system, where round-robin and time-sharing schedulers fail to meet the scheduling needs otherwise. Rate monotonic scheduling looks at a run modeling of all threads in the system and determines how much time is needed to meet the guarantees for the set of threads in question.

Optimality 
The rate-monotonic priority assignment is optimal under the given assumptions, meaning that if any static-priority scheduling algorithm can meet all the deadlines, then the rate-monotonic algorithm can too. The deadline-monotonic scheduling algorithm is also optimal with equal periods and deadlines, in fact in this case the algorithms are identical; in addition, deadline monotonic scheduling is optimal when deadlines are less than periods. For the task model in which deadlines can be greater than periods, Audsley's algorithm endowed with an exact schedulability test for this model finds an optimal priority assignment.

Upper bounds on utilization

Least upper bound 
 proved that for a set of  periodic tasks with unique periods, a feasible schedule that will always meet deadlines exists if the CPU utilization is below a specific bound (depending on the number of tasks). The schedulability test for RMS is:

For example,  for two processes. When the number of processes tends towards infinity, this expression will tend towards:

Therefore, a rough estimate when  is that RMS can meet all of the deadlines if total CPU utilization, is less than 70%. The other 30% of the CPU can be dedicated to lower-priority, non-real-time tasks.

In practice, for the  process,  should represent the worst-case (i.e. longest) computation time and  should represent the worst-case deadline (i.e. shortest period) in which all processing must occur.

Upper bound for harmonic task sets 

This is known as an harmonic task set. An example of this would be:  . It is acknowledged by Liu and Layland that it is not always feasible to have a harmonic task set and that in practice other mitigation measures, such as buffering for tasks with soft-time deadlines or using a dynamic priority assignment approach may be used instead to allow for a higher bound.

Generalization to harmonic chains 

Kuo and Mok showed that for a task set made up of  harmonic task subsets (known as harmonic chains), the least upper bound test becomes:

In the instance where no task period is an integer multiple of another, the task set can be thought of as being composed of  harmonic task subsets of size 1 and therefore , which makes this generalization equivalent to Liu and Layland's least upper bound.  When , the upper bound becomes 1.0, representing full utilization.

Stochastic bounds 

It has been shown that a randomly generated periodic task system will usually meet all deadlines when the utilization is 88% or less, however this fact depends on knowing the exact task statistics (periods, deadlines) which cannot be guaranteed for all task sets, and in some cases the authors found that the utilization reached the least upper bound presented by Liu and Layland.

Hyperbolic bound 
The hyperbolic bound is a tighter sufficient condition for schedulability than the one presented by Liu and Layland:
,
where  is the CPU utilization for each task.  It is the tightest upper bound that can be found using only the individual task utilization factors.

Resource sharing 

In many practical applications, resources are shared and the unmodified RMS will be subject to priority inversion and deadlock hazards. In practice, this is solved by disabling preemption or by priority inheritance. Alternative methods are to use lock-free algorithms or avoid the sharing of a mutex/semaphore across threads with different priorities. This is so that resource conflicts cannot result in the first place.

Disabling of preemption 

The OS_ENTER_CRITICAL() and OS_EXIT_CRITICAL() primitives that lock CPU interrupts in a real-time kernel, e.g. MicroC/OS-II
The splx() family of primitives which nest the locking of device interrupts (FreeBSD 5.x/6.x),

Priority inheritance 

The basic priority inheritance protocol promotes the priority of the task that holds the resource to the priority of the task that requests that resource at the time the request is made. Upon release of the resource, the original priority level before the promotion is restored. This method does not prevent deadlocks and suffers from chained blocking. That is, if a high priority task accesses multiple shared resources in sequence, it may have to wait (block) on a lower priority task for each of the resources. The real-time patch to the Linux kernel includes an implementation of this formula.

The priority ceiling protocol enhances the basic priority inheritance protocol by assigning a ceiling priority to each semaphore, which is the priority of the highest job that will ever access that semaphore. A job  cannot preempt a lower priority critical section if its priority is lower than the ceiling priority for that section. This method prevents deadlocks and bounds the blocking time to at most the length of one lower priority critical section. This method can be suboptimal, in that it can cause unnecessary blocking. The priority ceiling protocol is available in the VxWorks real-time kernel. It is also known as Highest Locker's Priority Protocol (HLP).

Priority inheritance algorithms can be characterized by two parameters. First, is the inheritance lazy (only when essential) or immediate (boost priority before there is a conflict). Second is the inheritance optimistic (boost a minimum amount) or pessimistic (boost by more than the minimum amount):

In practice there is no mathematical difference (in terms of the Liu-Layland system utilization bound) between the lazy and immediate algorithms, and the immediate algorithms are more efficient to implement, and so they are the ones used by most practical systems.

An example of usage of basic priority inheritance is related to the "Mars Pathfinder reset bug"  which was fixed on Mars by changing the creation flags for the semaphore so as to enable the priority inheritance.

Interrupt Service Routines 

All interrupt service routines (ISRs), whether they have a hard real-time deadline or not should be included in RMS analysis to determine schedulability in cases where ISRs have priorities above all scheduler-controlled tasks.  An ISR may already be appropriately prioritized under RMS rules if its processing period is shorter than that of the shortest, non-ISR process.  However, an ISR with a period/deadline longer than any non-ISR process period with a critical deadline results in a violation of RMS and prevents the use of the calculated bounds for determining schedulability of a task set.

Mitigating mis-prioritized ISRs 

One method for mitigating a mis-prioritized ISR is to adjust the analysis by reducing the ISR's period to be equal to that of the shortest period, if possible. Imposing this shorter period results in prioritization that conforms to RMS, but also results in a higher utilization factor for the ISR and therefore for the total utilization factor, which may still be below the allowable bound and therefore schedulability can be proven. As an example, consider a hardware ISR that has a computation time,  of 500 microseconds and a period, of 4 milliseconds. If the shortest scheduler-controlled task has a period,  of 1 millisecond, then the ISR would have a higher priority, but a lower rate, which violates RMS. For the purposes of proving schedulability, set  and recalculate the utilization factor for the ISR (which also raises the total utilization factor). This utilization factor would be used when adding up the total utilization factor for the task set and comparing to the upper bound to prove schedulability. It should be emphasized that adjusting the period of the ISR is for analysis only and that the true period of the ISR remains unchanged.

Another method for mitigating a mis-prioritized ISR is to use the ISR to only set a new semaphore/mutex while moving the time-intensive processing to a new process that has been appropriately prioritized using RMS and will block on the new semaphore/mutex.  When determining schedulability, a margin of CPU utilization due to ISR activity should be subtracted from the least upper bound.  ISRs with negligible utilization may be ignored.

Examples

Example 1

Under RMS, P2 has the highest rate (i.e. the shortest period) and so would have the highest priority, followed by P1 and finally P3.

Least Upper Bound 

The utilization will be: .

The sufficient condition for  processes, under which we can conclude that the system is schedulable is:

Because , and because being below the Least Upper Bound is a sufficient condition, the system is guaranteed to be schedulable.

Example 2

Under RMS, P2 has the highest rate (i.e. the shortest period) and so would have the highest priority, followed by P3 and finally P1.

Least Upper Bound 
Using the Liu and Layland bound, as in Example 1, the sufficient condition for  processes, under which we can conclude that the task set is schedulable, remains:

The total utilization will be: .

Since  the system is determined to not be guaranteed to be schedulable by the Liu and Layland bound.

Hyperbolic Bound 
Using the tighter Hyperbolic bound as follows:

it is found that the task set is schedulable.

Example 3

Under RMS, P2 has the highest rate (i.e. the shortest period) and so would have the highest priority, followed by P3 and finally P1.

Least Upper Bound 
Using the Liu and Layland bound, as in Example 1, the sufficient condition for  processes, under which we can conclude that the task set is schedulable, remains:

The total utilization will be: .

Since  the system is determined to not be guaranteed to be schedulable by the Liu and Layland bound.

Hyperbolic Bound 
Using the tighter Hyperbolic bound as follows:

Since  the system is determined to not be guaranteed to be schedulable by the Hyperbolic bound.

Harmonic Task Set Analysis 
Because , tasks 2 and 3 can be considered a harmonic task subset. Task 1 forms its own harmonic task subset.

Using the total utilization factor calculated above (0.81875), since  the system is determined to be schedulable.

See also

Deadline-monotonic scheduling
Deos, a time and space partitioned real-time operating system containing a working Rate Monotonic Scheduler.
Dynamic priority scheduling
Earliest deadline first scheduling
RTEMS, an open source real-time operating system containing a working Rate Monotonic Scheduler.
Scheduling (computing)

References

Further reading

.

, Chapter 6.
.

External links
 Mars Pathfinder Bug from Research @ Microsoft
 What really happened on Mars Rover Pathfinder by Mike Jones from The Risks Digest, Vol. 19, Issue 49
  The actual reason for the Mars Pathfinder Bug, by those who actually dealt with it, rather than someone whose company and therefore stock value depended upon the description of the problem, or someone who heard someone talking about the problem.

Processor scheduling algorithms
Real-time computing